Sebastopol railway station was a railway station which served the village of Sebastopol near Pontypool in Torfaen, South Wales, UK.

History
The station was opened by the Great Western Railway on 28 May 1928 on its line from Pontypool to Newport. It closed on 30 April 1962.

The island platform station lay to the south west of the extant Avondale Road overbridge, parallel to Railway Terrace. There are no remains of the station today, but the trackbed has been redeveloped into a cyclepath as part of National Cycle Route 46.

The station was the second to have served the area as the Great Western had opened an earlier station on its Pontypool, Caerleon and Newport Railway in December 1875, which was initially known as Sebastopol but was later renamed "Panteg".

References

Notes

Sources

External links
Station on a navigable 1947 O.S. map

Disused railway stations in Torfaen
Railway stations in Great Britain opened in 1928
Railway stations in Great Britain closed in 1962
Former Great Western Railway stations